Wolf 359 is a science fiction podcast created by Gabriel Urbina and produced by Gabriel Urbina and Zach Valenti under Kinda Evil Genius Productions. Following in the tradition of Golden Age radio dramas, Wolf 359 tells the story of a dysfunctional space station crew orbiting the star Wolf 359 on a deep space survey mission. The show starts off as lighthearted comedy that focuses on character dynamics before becoming more of a thriller. After 61 episodes, the show concluded on December 25, 2017.

Wolf 359 made over $3000 per episode from over 900 patrons on Patreon before the series ended. As of 2018 the podcast had over 6 million downloads. Urbina regularly participates in panels and workshops regarding audio dramas and their future.

Content

Synopsis 
Wolf 359 begins as a series of audio logs recorded by Doug Eiffel, showing the life of the skeleton crew on board the U.S.S. Hephaestus. Doug Eiffel's job on board the station is to scan for signs of alien life, but instead he finds recordings of classical music from Earth. After realizing the recordings are too old to have come from Earth, Dr. Hilbert, the station's science officer, sends this information to Goddard Futuristics, the company funding the mission. The crew finds out that they were never intended to leave the station, and the show focuses more on the rest of the ensemble cast as it becomes a dramatic science fiction adventure.

Characters 

Doug Eiffel – voiced by Zach Valenti. Communications officer and primary narrator of Wolf 359, Eiffel is a consummate slacker who prefers finding creative ways to ignore his duties to actually performing them.
Renée Minkowski – voiced by Emma Sherr-Ziarko. Commander and navigations specialist of the U.S.S. Hephaestus mission. A straight-laced former Air Force pilot, Minkowski is fulfilling her dream of commanding a deep space mission.
Hera – voiced by Michaela Swee. Hera is an intelligent supercomputer tasked with managing the station's many automatic systems, but with a concerning propensity for glitches.
Dr. Alexander Hilbert – voiced by Zach Valenti. Chief science officer. Dr. Hilbert is a reserved and reclusive man and a towering intellect. He is on the Hephaestus mission to experiment on microbes utilizing Wolf 359's unique radiation.
Marcus Cutter – voiced by Scotty Shoemaker. Director of communications for Goddard Futuristics. The de facto head of Goddard Futuristics, Mr. Cutter takes a personal interest in the mission to Wolf 359.
Isabel Lovelace – voiced by Cecilia Lynn-Jacobs. Commander of the previous U.S.S. Hephaestus mission.
Warren Kepler – voiced by Zach Libresco. Director of intelligence for Goddard's Special Projects division.
Daniel Jacobi – voiced by Noah Masur. Demolitions expert with the Special Projects SI-5 unit.
Dr. Alana Maxwell – voiced by Michelle Agresti. A.I. specialist with the Special Projects SI-5 unit.
Dr. Miranda Pryce – voiced by Michaela Swee.  A.I. specialist implied to be the inventor of A.I.s. Creator of many biotechnical modifications to both her and Cutter's bodies.

Accolades

Audio Verse Awards

Parsec Awards

Webby Awards

References

External links 
 

2014 podcast debuts
Audio podcasts
Science fiction podcasts
Fiction set around Wolf 359
American podcasts
Scripted podcasts